The Hochseiler (also Hochsailer) is a mountain, in the Hochkönig massif within the Berchtesgaden Alps. It lies on the boundary between the districts of Zell am See and St. Johann im Pongau in the Austrian state of Salzburg.

The summit can be gained from the north along the Mooshammersteig path or from the Teufelslöcher over the Übergossene Alm along the southeastern arête (climbing grade I–II).

Literature 
 
 Albert Precht: Alpenvereinsführer Hochkönig. 1st edn., Bergverlag Rother, Munich, 1989, .

Two-thousanders of Austria
Mountains of the Alps
Mountains of Salzburg (state)
Berchtesgaden Alps